Tucales franciscus is a species of beetle in the family Cerambycidae. It was described by Thomson in 1857. It is known from Brazil, Mexico, and French Guiana.

References

Compsosomatini
Beetles described in 1857